730 Athanasia (prov. designation:  or ) is a background asteroid from the inner regions of the asteroid belt, approximately  in diameter. It was discovered by Austrian astronomer Johann Palisa at the Vienna Observatory on 10 April 1912. The presumed stony S-type asteroid has a rotation period of 5.7 hours and is likely very elongated in shape. It was named Athanasia, the Greek word for "immortality".

Orbit and classification 

Located in the region of the Flora family, a giant asteroid family and the largest family of stony asteroids in the main-belt, Athanasia is a non-family asteroid of the main belt's background population when applying the hierarchical clustering method to its proper orbital elements. It orbits the Sun in the inner asteroid belt at a distance of 1.8–2.6 AU once every 3 years and 4 months (1,228 days; semi-major axis of 2.24 AU). Its orbit has an eccentricity of 0.18 and an inclination of 4° with respect to the ecliptic. The body's observation arc begins at Vienna Observatory on 15 April 1912, or five nights after its official discovery observation.

Naming 

This minor planet was named by friends of the discoverer after the Greek word for immortality, "athanasia". Any reference to a person or occurrence is unknown. The  was mentioned in The Names of the Minor Planets by Paul Herget in 1955.

Physical characteristics 

Athanasia is an assumed, stony S-type asteroid.

Rotation period 

In February 2016, a rotational lightcurve of Athanasia was obtained from photometric observations by Frederick Pilcher at the Organ Mesa Observatory  in New Mexico, United States. Analysis gave a classically shaped, well-defined bimodal lightcurve with a rotation period of  hours and a very high brightness variation of  magnitude, indicative of a highly elongated shape.

Diameter and albedo 

The Collaborative Asteroid Lightcurve Link assumes a standard albedo for a Florian asteroid of 0.24 and calculates a diameter of 4.94 kilometers based on an absolute magnitude of 13.7.

Notes

References

External links 
 Lightcurve Database Query (LCDB), at www.minorplanet.info
 Dictionary of Minor Planet Names, Google books
 Discovery Circumstances: Numbered Minor Planets (1)-(5000) – Minor Planet Center
 
 

000730
Discoveries by Johann Palisa
Named minor planets
19120410